Shenshi may refer to:

 Shaanxi province of People's Republic of China
 绅士, the gentry class in imperial China